Ed "Punky" Holler (born Joseph Edward Holler; January 23, 1940, in Bluefield, West Virginia), is a former linebacker in the National Football League.

Football career
Holler was drafted in the fourteenth round of the 1963 NFL Draft by the Green Bay Packers and played that season with team. The following season, he played with the Pittsburgh Steelers.

He played at the collegiate level at the University of South Carolina.

Career as a Lawyer

Holler represented football legend George Rogers on his cocaine charges in 1990. In 2014, he received the Presidents Award from the South Carolina Association for Justice. At the time of his death, in 2021, Holler was a named partner with HOLLER, GARNER, CORBETT, GILCHRIST, & MASON.

See also
List of Green Bay Packers players
List of Pittsburgh Steelers players

References

1940 births
People from Bluefield, West Virginia
Green Bay Packers players
Pittsburgh Steelers players
American football linebackers
South Carolina Gamecocks football players
Living people